Yekimovo is a rural locality (a village) in Piksimovskoye Rural Settlement, Vashkinsky District, Vologda Oblast, Russia. The population was 17 as of 2002. There are 2 streets.

Geography 
Yekimovo is located 50 km northwest of Lipin Bor (the district's administrative centre) by road. Popovka is the nearest rural locality.

References 

Rural localities in Vashkinsky District